County Road 27 is a county road which runs between Ringebu and Folldal in Innlandet county, Norway. The road runs through Folldal, Stor-Elvdal, and Ringebu municipalities. The northern part of this road in Folldal and Stor-Elvdal is classified as a national tourist route.

Historically, County Road 27 went from Folldal to Enden (in Stor-Elvdal) and then turned east through Sollia and headed to Atna where it ended. At that time, the stretch of road between Enden and Ringebu was called National Road 220. On 1 January 2010, National Road 220 became part of County Road 27 and what used to be County Road 27 from Enden to Atna was renamed County Road 219.

References

027
Roads in Innlandet
National Tourist Routes in Norway
Folldal
Ringebu
Stor-Elvdal